Walpurgis Night (stylized as 回:Walpurgis Night) is the fourth (promoted as third Korean-language) and final studio album by South Korean girl group GFriend. It was released on November 9, 2020, by Source Music and distributed by Kakao M. The album contains 11 songs including the lead single "Mago". It would become their final release before the departure of all the group members from Source Music following the termination of their contracts.

Release and promotion 

On October 12, 2020, it was reported that GFriend would come back on November 9 with a new studio album titled 回:Walpurgis Night. It's the third and last release of the series "回". Preorders began on October 19. On October 20, it was confirmed that the group will perform some tracks from the album in advance during their online concert GFriend C:ON on October 31. On October 24, the group released the checklist of their album. The tracklist of 回:Walpurgis Night was released two days later, including the lead single "Mago" as well as previous releases "Apple", "Crossroads" and "Labyrinth". On October 27, the first set of concept photos titled "My Way" were released. The second set titled "My Room" was released on October 28. Moving photos for "My Room" only were uploaded later on the same day. On October 29, Source Music released the last set of concept photos titled "My Girls". On October 31, the group revealed and performed in advance the sub-unit songs "Secret Diary", "Better Me" and "Night Drive" during their online concert GFriend C:ON. On the same day, members Eunha and Umji showcased a tip of the song and the choreography for "Mago" on the show Knowing Bros. On November 4, the highlight medley for the album was uploaded on HYBE Labels' YouTube channel. The first teaser for their lead single "Mago" was uploaded on the same channel on November 6. Two days later, the second teaser was released.

The album was released on November 9, The music video for "Mago" was released on the same day.

Production and composition 
For "Mago", Eunha, Yuju and Umji participated in composing and writing lyrics for the song.

"Secret Diary", "Better Me" and "Night Drive" are sub-unit songs, performed respectively by Yerin and SinB, by Sowon and Umji and by Eunha and Yuju. Each of the members participated in composing and writing lyrics for their respective song.

The songs "Apple", "Crossroads" and "Labyrinth" were previously released from the prior '回' album series, with the tracks having updated harmonies during the choruses. These versions of the songs are not found on the iTunes version of the album, rather are on the physical release of the CD.

Critical reception
Beats Per Minute called Walpurgis Night as "a bold, vibrant and occasionally experimental album that finds GFriend shedding the melancholy of their previous two releases." It gave the album a score of 68%, evaluating it as "a daring reinvention that adds new dimensions to their discography. However, the group haven't fully veered away from what has made them one of the most distinguished groups in K-pop, and what makes this album special is how they have reserved their bright energy for internal healing and liberation, but still keep romance in their peripheral vision."

IZM gave Walpurgis Night 3 out of 5 stars, stating that, aside from a slight sense of incongruity, "the good melody, which were the center of the team, is safely inherited" in GFriend's new path; however, it found that the '回' trilogy clashed with the group's previous releases, "trying to burn too many stories and excessive intervention that does not seem to take into account the existing identity."

Track listing

Charts

Weekly charts

Monthly charts

Accolades

Release history

Notes

References

GFriend albums
2020 albums
Korean-language albums
Kakao M albums
Hybe Corporation albums